Charles Fitzwilliam may refer to:

Charles Fitzwilliam, 3rd Earl Fitzwilliam
Charles Fitzwilliam, 5th Earl Fitzwilliam

See also
Charles Wentworth-Fitzwilliam (disambiguation)